The Leigh-Salford-Manchester Bus Rapid Transit scheme in Greater Manchester, England provides transport connections between Leigh, Atherton, Tyldesley, Ellenbrook and Manchester city centre via Salford. The guided busway and bus rapid transit (BRT) scheme promoted by Transport for Greater Manchester (TfGM) opened on 3 April 2016. Built by Balfour Beatty at a total cost of £122 million to improve links from former Manchester Coalfield towns into Manchester city centre, the busway proposal encountered much opposition and a public enquiry in 2002 before construction finally started in 2013. A branch route from Atherton, and an extension to the Manchester Royal Infirmary have been added to the planned
original scheme.

Twenty-five purple-liveried Wright Eclipse Gemini 3 bodied Volvo B5LH hybrid double-decker equipped with CCTV and next stop audio and visual announcements operate the service. Stops on the guided busway section have level-boarding from platforms equipped with passenger information display screens.

From Leigh, the V1 limited-stop bus service joins seven kilometres of guided busway to Ellenbrook, six kilometres of bus lanes on the East Lancashire Road and sections of reserved bus lanes through Salford and Manchester city centres. The V2 service from Atherton to Manchester joins the guided busway at Tyldesley. Both services run via the University of Manchester and Manchester Metropolitan University before terminating at Manchester Royal Infirmary.

Background
Leigh, one of the largest towns in Britain without a railway station after the closure of the Tyldesley Loopline in 1969, suffered from poor transport connections to neighbouring towns. A guided busway scheme using a kerbed concrete track was proposed and constructed using the former railway trackbed from Leigh to Ellenbrook to improve access to Manchester city centre from Leigh, Tyldesley and Ellenbrook and regenerate areas of the former Manchester Coalfield. 

When proposed, the busway was controversial and encountered much local opposition. It was branded the 'Misguided Busway' by a Salford councillor. Critics contested claims by TfGM that the creation of within-carriageway bus lanes would not reduce general traffic capacity along the East Lancashire Road, a heavily congested radial route for traffic heading towards Manchester and Salford city centres; but instead increase it.

Route

The BRT route begins at Leigh bus station, and joins the guided section at East Bond Street. It proceeds through Leigh and along the converted rail alignment via Tyldesley to Newearth Road in Ellenbrook. An improved bus route from Atherton joins the route at Astley Street, Tyldesley. From Ellenbrook the route continues via bus lanes alongside the A580 East Lancashire Road, serving Worsley and Swinton before joining the A6 at Irlams o' th' Height.  All stops along the A580 bus lanes are bus bays so that conventional stopping services can be overtaken by limited-stop expresses. It passes the University of Salford/Salford Crescent railway station before continuing through Manchester city centre and along bus-only lanes on Oxford Road to Manchester Metropolitan University, Manchester University and the Central Manchester Hospitals. Buses use Bolton Road in Salford when Broad Street is congested.

The guided section has stops at East Bond Street, Holden Road in Leigh and Cooling Lane between Higher Folds and Squires Lane in Tyldesley, Astley Street, Hough Lane and Sale Lane in Tyldesley and Newearth Road in Ellenbrook. The multi-user path for walkers, horse riders and cyclists alongside the guided section provides access for emergency vehicles and maintenance. For cyclists the path from Tyldesley to Ellenbrook is part of the National Cycle Network Route 55.

The route from Leigh to Central Manchester Hospitals has 36 stops and the connecting route from Tyldesley to Atherton has five. Park and ride facilities are provided at East Bond Street, Astley Street and Wardley (where the A580 road passes under the M60 motorway).

Services
First Greater Manchester runs the service under a 10-year contract from TfGM, branded Vantage. Service V1 operates from Leigh and  V2 from Atherton; with additional V4 services from Ellenbrook in the weekday morning peak period that does not use the guided section of the route. Timetabled journey times are 55 minutes from Leigh and Atherton to Albert Square, Manchester at peak periods; 45 minutes daytime off-peak and 40 minutes in evenings and early mornings.  In daytime operation from Monday to Saturday at least eight buses per hour run in each direction on the guided section, four on the Leigh to Tyldesley section and four from Atherton joining the Tyldesley to Ellenbrook section.

The earliest weekday departures from Leigh/Atherton are at 04:00/04:29 respectively; and last trips from Manchester Royal Infirmary at 00:00/23:45.  Two additional V1 services run from Leigh into Manchester in the weekday morning peak; three additional services return to Leigh in the weekday evening peak.  Four further additional V4 services run into Manchester in the morning peak, starting from Ellenbrook.  

The introduction of the Vantage services resulted in the withdrawal of a number of services by operator First. Others were amended to join the A580 bus lanes east of Boothstown.

The services were amongst those set to transfer to Go North West when it took over First's Cheetham Hill depot in 2019, but it was later announced that First will continue to operate the service.

Operation

After light-controlled junctions along the East Lancashire Road were upgraded with SCOOT adaptive signalling in July 2016, TfGM reported in the October that traffic journey times on this section had returned to pre-construction levels in the morning peak while accommodating significant additional traffic.

In the first six months of operation, more than 900,000 passenger journeys were made. A survey of users published in October 2016 revealed that 20% of passengers had switched from using their cars for the same journey, and nearly all respondents would recommend the service. More than a quarter of busway users walked or travelled more than a kilometre to reach the busway.  By the third year of operation, it was being estimated that 580,000 car trips per year along the BRT route had transferred to bus ridership.

The service attracted about 28,000 passengers per week when it started in April 2016 rising to 45,000 by the autumn and 55,000 in the run up to Christmas 2016. In the first year more than 2.1 million passengers were carried; increasing to approximately 2.6 million in the second, and 3 million in the third.  By December 2017, weekly ridership had increased to 62,000. This has further increased to a record 71,626 weekly passengers in December 2019.

Buses
Services were initially operated by 20 Wright Eclipse Gemini 3 bodied Volvo B5LH hybrid double-decker buses in purple-livery. They are equipped with CCTV and next stop audio and visual announcements, USB charging points and free Wi-Fi. Five more buses were purchased in January 2017 to provide extra capacity at busy times and facilitate the extended service to Central Manchester Hospitals. It is required that buses that operate the busway service are replaced after 5 years of service. Further buses are scheduled to enter service in September 2018. These will operate the V4 service from Ellenbrook, and will be standard vehicles not adapted for busway running.

In February 2019, TfGM were successful in bidding for funding support in buying an additional 10 electric buses for busway operation, to enter service in March 2020.  These will be Alexander Dennis Enviro400 MMC double-deckers with BYD Company battery power. TfGM intend that eventually all Vantage services will be operated by electric buses; to be purchased and owned by TfGM themselves, rather than by the service operator. Five of the existing fleet of Volvo B5LH buses will be transferred to other services in Greater Manchester; and so total fleet will increase to 30, allowing increased daytime frequency on V1 services from Leigh.

Stops, signalling and ticketing 
Stops along the guided busway section provide level-boarding from platforms and are equipped with passenger information display screens. The guided busway crosses local roads on level, light-controlled junctions at which busway services have priority. Standard First Greater Manchester fares include travel on Vantage services.

Awards
The scheme won the Transport Policy, Planning and Implementation award at the Chartered Institute of Logistics and Transport North West Awards and the award for sustainability at the 10th annual North West Construction Awards in 2016. The launch of the Vantage service won the Transport Project of the Year category and the Leigh to Ellenbrook Guided Busway section was the winner in the Construction and Engineering category at the National and the North of England Transport Awards in December 2016. Greater Manchester's Bus Priority Package won the National Transport Award for improvements to bus services in October 2017.

History

Planning
A long legal process preceded the busway's construction, including a public inquiry in 2002. The decision of the public inquiry was delayed because of great crested newts occupying a site on the route. The Department for Transport granted powers to build the busway in 2005 and it was projected to be built by 2009 but preliminary work only started in 2012. Powers to build it are set out in the Greater Manchester (Leigh Busway) Order 2005 in the Transport and Works Act. The Greater Manchester Passenger Transport Executive estimated in 2005 that the busway would generate around 2 million passenger trips per annum. After the public inquiry, a branch bus route from Atherton to Tyldesley and an extension from Manchester city centre to the Manchester Royal Infirmary were added to the scheme.

Construction

Site clearance for the dedicated busway section between Leigh and Ellenbrook took place between November 2012 and March 2013. Balfour Beatty began its construction in September 2013. A short section of the busway west of Newearth Road was completed in early 2015 and in the April was used for a trial of the construction method and the bus guidance system. Following delays due to bad weather and other problems, the busway works were rescheduled to be completed before the end of 2015. The service began on 3 April 2016 to coordinate with associated road and tram works in Manchester city centre.

TfGM spent £122 million on bus priority investment of which the guided busway track and infrastructure cost £68 million and the rest was spent upgrading associated local roads, bus lanes and junctions. The Greater Manchester Transport Fund provided most of the funding and the Department for Transport contributed £32.5 million.

Integration with other services
In November 2020, local MP James Grundy suggested the system should be integrated with the Manchester Metrolink light rail system.

From 24 September 2023, the busway will become part of the Bee Network, a London-style integrated transport system.

References

External links
Bus Priority Transport For Greater Manchester
Vantage First Greater Manchester

Guided busways and BRT systems in the United Kingdom
Leigh, Greater Manchester
Transport infrastructure completed in 2016
Bus routes in Greater Manchester
2016 establishments in England